Lake stratification is the tendency of lakes to form separate and distinct thermal layers during warm weather. Typically stratified lakes show three distinct layers, the Epilimnion comprising the top warm layer, the thermocline (or Metalimnion): the middle layer, which may change depth throughout the day, and the colder Hypolimnion extending to the floor of the lake.

Every lake has a set mixing regime that is influenced by lake morphometry and environmental conditions. However, changes to human influences in the form of land use change, increases in temperatures, and changes to weather patterns have been shown to alter the timing and intensity of stratification in lakes around the globe. These changes can further alter the fish, zooplankton, and phytoplankton community composition, in addition to creating gradients that alter the availability of dissolved oxygen and nutrients.

On a global scale, rising temperatures and changing weather patterns can also affect stratification in lakes. Rising air temperatures have the same effect on lake bodies as a physical shift in geographic location, with tropical zones being particularly sensitive.

Definition
The thermal stratification of lakes refers to a change in the temperature at different depths in the lake, and is due to the density of water varying with temperature. Cold water is denser than warm water and the epilimnion generally consists of water that is not as dense as the water in the hypolimnion. However, the temperature of maximum density for freshwater is 4 °C. In temperate regions where lake water warms up and cools through the seasons, a cyclical pattern of overturn occurs that is repeated from year to year as the cold dense water at the top of the lake sinks (see stable and unstable stratification). For example, in dimictic lakes the lake water turns over during the spring and the fall. This process occurs more slowly in deeper water and as a result, a thermal bar may form. If the stratification of water lasts for extended periods, the lake is meromictic.

In shallow lakes, stratification into epilimnion, metalimnion, and hypolimnion often does not occur, as wind or cooling causes regular mixing throughout the year. These lakes are called polymictic. There is not a fixed depth that separates polymictic and stratifying lakes, as apart from depth, this is also influenced by turbidity, lake surface area, and climate.

The lake mixing regime (e.g. polymictic, dimictic, meromictic) describes the yearly patterns of lake stratification that occur in most years. However, short-term events can influence lake stratification as well. Heat waves can cause periods of stratification in otherwise mixed, shallow lakes, while mixing events, such as storms or large river discharge, can break down stratification. Recent research suggests that seasonally ice-covered dimictic lakes may be described as "cryostratified" or "cryomictic" according to their wintertime stratification regimes. Cryostratified lakes exhibit inverse stratification near the ice surface and have depth-averaged temperatures near 4°C, while cryomictic lakes have no under-ice thermocline and have depth-averaged winter temperatures closer to 0°C.

The accumulation of dissolved carbon dioxide in three meromictic lakes in Africa (Lake Nyos and Lake Monoun in Cameroon and Lake Kivu in Rwanda) is potentially dangerous because if one of these lakes is triggered into limnic eruption, a very large quantity of carbon dioxide can quickly leave the lake and displace the oxygen needed for life by people and animals in the surrounding area.

De-stratification

In temperate latitudes, many lakes that become stratified during the summer months de-stratify during cooler windier weather with surface mixing by wind being a significant driver in this process. This is often referred to as "autumn turn-over". The mixing of the hypolimnium into the mixed water body of the lake recirculates nutrients, particularly phosphorus compounds, trapped in the hypolimnion during the warm weather. It also poses a risk of oxygen sag as a long established hypolimnion can be anoxic or very low in oxygen.

Lake mixing regimes can shift in response to increasing air temperatures. Some dimictic lakes can turn into monomictic lakes, while some monomictic lakes might become meromictic, as a consequence of rising temperatures.

Many types of aeration equipment have been used to thermally de-stratify lakes, particularly lakes subject to low oxygen or undesirable algal blooms. In fact, natural resource and environmental managers are often challenged by problems caused by lake and pond thermal stratification. Fish die-offs have been directly associated with thermal gradients, stagnation, and ice cover. Excessive growth of plankton may limit the recreational use of lakes and the commercial use of lake water. With severe thermal stratification in a lake, the quality of drinking water also can be adversely affected. For fisheries managers, the spatial distribution of fish within a lake is often adversely affected by thermal stratification and in some cases may indirectly cause large die-offs of recreationally important fish. One commonly used tool to reduce the severity of these lake management problems is to eliminate or lessen thermal stratification through aeration. Aeration has met with some success, although it has rarely proved to be a panacea.

Anthropogenic influences 
Every lake has a set mixing regime that is influenced by lake morphometry and environmental conditions. However, changes to human influences in the form of land use change, increases in temperatures, and changes to weather patterns have been shown to alter the timing and intensity of stratification in lakes around the globe. These changes can further alter the fish, zooplankton, and phytoplankton community composition, in addition to creating gradients that alter the availability of dissolved oxygen and nutrients.

There are a number of ways in which changes in human land use influence lake stratification and consequently water conditions. Urban expansion has led to the construction of roads and houses close to previously isolated lakes, sometimes causing increased runoff and pollution. The addition of particulate matter to lake bodies can lower water clarity, resulting in stronger thermal stratification and overall lower average water column temperatures, which can eventually affect the onset of ice cover. Water quality can also be influenced by the runoff of salt from roads and sidewalks, which often creates a benthic saline layer that interferes with vertical mixing of surface waters. Further, the saline layer can prevent dissolved oxygen from reaching the bottom sediments, decreasing phosphorus recycling and affecting microbial communities.

On a global scale, rising temperatures and changing weather patterns can also affect stratification in lakes. Rising air temperatures have the same effect on lake bodies as a physical shift in geographic location, with tropical zones being particularly sensitive. The intensity and scope of impact depends on location and lake morphometry, but in some cases can be so extreme as to require a reclassification from monomictic to dimictic (e.g. Great Bear Lake). Globally, lake stratification appears to be more stable with deeper and steeper thermoclines, and average lake temperature as a main determinant in the stratification response to changing temperatures. Further, surface warming rates are much greater than bottom warming rates, again indicating stronger thermal stratification across lakes.

Changes to stratification patterns can also alter the community composition of lake ecosystems. In shallow lakes, temperature increases can alter the diatom community; while in deep lakes, the change is reflected in the deep chlorophyll layer taxa. Changes in mixing patterns and increased nutrient availability can also affect zooplankton species composition and abundance, while decreased nutrient availability can be detrimental for benthic communities and fish habitat.

See also
Aquatic Science
Stratification (water)
Hypoxia
Freshwater ecosystems
Water column
Lake aeration

References

Stratification
Limnology